A mercury coulometer is an electroanalytical chemistry device using mercury to determine the amount of matter transformed (in coulombs) during the following reaction:
Hg^2+{} + 2e^- <=> Hg^\circ

These oxidation/reduction processes have 100% efficiency with the wide range of the current densities. Measuring of the quantity of electricity (coulombs) is based on the changes of the mass of the mercury electrode. Mass of the electrode can be increased during cathodic deposition of the mercury ions or decreased during the anodic dissolution of the metal.
,
where 
, quantity of electricity;
, mass changes;
, Faraday constant
, the molar mass of mercury

Construction
This coulometer has different constructions but all of them are based on mass measurements. The device consists of two reservoirs connected by a thin graduated capillary tube containing a solution of the mercury(II)-ions. Each of the reservoirs has an electrode immersed in a drop of mercury. Another small drop of mercury is inserted into the capillary. When the current is turned on, it initiates dissolution of the metallic mercury on one side of the drop in the capillary and deposition on the other side of the same drop. This drop starts to move. Because of the high efficiency of the deposition/dissolution of the mercury under the current influence, the mass or volume of this small drop is constant and its movement is linearly correlated with the passed charge. If the direction of the current is changed, the drop moves in the opposite direction. The sensitivity of this type of coulometer depends on the diameter of the capillary.

See also
Copper coulometer

Notes

Mercury (element)
Electroanalytical chemistry devices
Coulometers